The 1998 NCAA Men's Water Polo Championship was the 30th annual NCAA Men's Water Polo Championship to determine the national champion of NCAA men's collegiate water polo. Tournament matches were played at the Marian Bergeson Aquatic Center in Newport Beach, California during December 1998.

USC defeated Stanford in the final, 9–8 (in two overtimes), to win their first national title. The Trojans had previously gone 0–6 in tournament finals appearances. The Trojans (25–3) were coached by John Williams and Jovan Vavic.

The Most Outstanding Players of the tournament were Chris Aguilera (Stanford), Ivan Babic (USC), and Marko Pintaric (USC). These three, along with five other players, comprised the All-Tournament Team.

The tournament's leading scorer, with 5 goals, was George Csaszar from USC.

Qualification
Since there has only ever been one single national championship for water polo, all NCAA men's water polo programs (whether from Division I, Division II, or Division III) were eligible. A total of 4 teams were invited to contest this championship.

Bracket
Site: Marian Bergeson Aquatic Center, Newport Beach, California

All-tournament team 
Chris Aguilera, Stanford (Most outstanding player)
Ivan Babic, USC (Most outstanding player)
Layne Beaubien, Stanford
James Castle, USC
George Csaszar, USC
Brian Heifferon, Stanford
Ross Mecham, UC San Diego
Marko Pintaric, USC (Most outstanding player)

See also 
 NCAA Men's Water Polo Championship

References

NCAA Men's Water Polo Championship
NCAA Men's Water Polo Championship
1998 in sports in California
December 1998 sports events in the United States
1998